Beau Christian Knapp (born April 17, 1989) is an American actor. He is known for his roles in The Signal (2014), Run All Night (2015), and Southpaw (2015). Knapp portrayed a lead villain in Death Wish (2018), the sixth installment of the Death Wish series. In 2021, he starred in the TV series adaptation of The Lost Symbol.

Early life
Knapp was born in Los Angeles, California.

Career
In 2011, Knapp made his film debut as Breen in the science-fiction adventure film Super 8. He played Denny in the horror thriller film No One Lives (2012).  On television, Knapp appeared in a 2013 episode of the television series Bones.

Other film roles include the character Jonah Breck in the science fiction thriller The Signal (2014), Jackson in the drama You're Not You (2014), Kenan Boyle in the crime thriller Run All Night (2015), Jon Jon in the boxing drama Southpaw (2015).

In 2016, Knapp played the best friend of Chris Pine's character in the disaster drama film The Finest Hours. He then played the villain Blue Face in the mystery thriller The Nice Guys, as well as violent Crack in the war film Billy Lynn's Long Halftime Walk.

Knapp appeared in the Netflix war drama film Sand Castle (2017), and appeared in a co-starring role in the Netflix series Seven Seconds (2018).

Knapp appeared as the main villain, opposite Bruce Willis, in Eli Roth's remake of Death Wish. He also played the main antagonist in Measure of a Man.

Filmography

Film

Television

References

External links 
 

Living people
1989 births
American male film actors
American film producers
21st-century American male actors
American male television actors